Anbulla Appa is a 1987 Indian Tamil-language drama film directed by A. C. Tirulokchandar for AVM Productions. The film stars Sivaji Ganesan, Nadhiya and Rahman. This was Tirulokchandar's last directorial venture before his retirement from films.

Plot 

The story deals with the deep bond between a father played by Shivaji Ganesan and daughter played by Nadiya which causes trouble post her marriage because of the daughter Nadiya prioritizing her relationship with her father over her husband.

Cast 
Sivaji Ganesan
Rahman
Nadhiya
Sangeeta
Jai Ganesh
V. K. Ramasamy
Manorama
Vinu Chakravarthy

Soundtrack 
The music was composed by Shankar–Ganesh, with lyrics by Vairamuthu. The song "Maragathavallikku" is set in Brindavani raga.

Reception 
The Indian Express said, "Anbulla Appa anchors itself on the Sivaji-Nadiya equation not giving itself room even for lateral movement for plot development."

References

External links 
 

1980s Tamil-language films
1987 drama films
1987 films
Films directed by A. C. Tirulokchandar
Films scored by Shankar–Ganesh
Indian drama films